The Lippincott Baronetcy, of Stoke Bishop in the County of Gloucester, was a title in the Baronetage of Great Britain. It was created on 7 September 1778 for Henry Lippincott, later Member of Parliament for Bristol. The title became extinct on the death of the second Baronet in 1829.

Lippincott baronets, of Stoke Bishop (1778)
Sir Henry Lippincott, 1st Baronet (1737–1780)
Sir Henry Cann Lippincott, 2nd Baronet (1776–1829)

References

Extinct baronetcies in the Baronetage of Great Britain